The 2021–22 Indiana Hoosiers women's basketball team represented the Indiana University Bloomington during the 2021–22 NCAA Division I women's basketball season. The Hoosiers were led by head coach Teri Moren in her eighth season, and played their home games at the Simon Skjodt Assembly Hall as a member of the Big Ten Conference.

Previous season
The Hoosiers finished the 2020–21 season with a 21–5 record, including 16–2 in Big Ten play to finish in second place in the conference. They received an at-large bid to the 2021 NCAA Division I women's basketball tournament, where they advanced to the Elite Eight.

Roster

Schedule and results

|-
!colspan=9 style=| Exhibition

|-
!colspan=9 style=| Regular Season

|-
!colspan=9 style=| Big Ten Women's Tournament

|-
!colspan=9 style=| NCAA tournament

Rankings

* Coaches did not release a week 1 poll.

References

Indiana Hoosiers women's basketball seasons
Indiana
Indiana
Indiana
Indiana